Edward Dexter Holbrook (May 6, 1836 – June 18, 1870) was an American lawyer and politician who served as a congressional delegate for the Idaho Territory from 1865 to 1869.

Early life and education 
Born in Elyria, Ohio, Holbrook attended public schools and earned a Bachelor of Laws from Oberlin College.

Career 
He was admitted to the bar in 1859 and practiced law in Elyria, Ohio; Weaverville, California; and Placerville, Idaho.

Holbrook was elected as a Democrat to the 39th and 40th Congresses; serving from (March 4, 1865 - March 3, 1869). He was censured by the United States House of Representatives on February 4, 1869, for use of unparliamentary language and did not stand as a candidate for re-election.

Personal life 
Holbrook was shot by Charles H. Douglas in Idaho City, Idaho Territory on June 17, 1870, and died from his wounds the next day. He was interred in the Masonic Burial Ground in that city. Holbrook, Idaho, is named in his honor.

See also
List of assassinated American politicians
List of United States representatives expelled, censured, or reprimanded

References

External links
Edward Dexter Holbrook entry at The Political Graveyard

1836 births
1870 deaths
1870 murders in the United States
19th-century American lawyers
19th-century American politicians
Assassinated American politicians
California lawyers
Censured or reprimanded members of the United States House of Representatives
Deaths by firearm in Idaho
Delegates to the United States House of Representatives from Idaho Territory
Idaho Democrats
Idaho lawyers
Ohio lawyers
People from Elyria, Ohio
People murdered in Idaho

Assassinated United States House candidates